Dorzolamide, sold under the brand name Trusopt among others, is a medication used to treat high pressure inside the eye, including in cases of glaucoma. It is used as an eye drop. Effects begin within three hours and last for at least eight hours. It is also available as the combination dorzolamide/timolol.

Common side effects include eye discomfort, eye redness, taste changes, and blurry vision. Serious side effects include Steven Johnson syndrome. Those allergic to sulfonamides may be allergic to dorzolamide. Use is not recommended in pregnancy or breastfeeding. It is a carbonic anhydrase inhibitor and works by decreasing the production of aqueous humour.

Dorzolamide was approved for medical use in the United States in 1994. It is available as a generic medication. In 2020, it was the 216th most commonly prescribed medication in the United States, with more than 2million prescriptions. It is a second-generation carbonic anhydrase inhibitor.

Medical uses
Dorzolamide hydrochloride is used to lower excessive intraocular pressure in open-angle glaucoma and ocular hypertension. This drug is able to cross the cornea, reach the ciliary body of the eye, and produce systemic effects on the carbonic anhydrase enzyme within the eye.

Side effects
Ocular stinging, burning, itching and bitter taste. It causes shallowing of the anterior chamber and leads to transient myopia. As a second generation carbonic anhydrase inhibitor, Dorzolamide avoids systemic effects associated with first generation carbonic anhydrase inhibitors such as Acetazolamide, Methazolamide, and Dichlorphenamide.

Pharmacodynamics

Dorzolamide lowers intraocular pressure by about 20%. Normally, carbonic anhydrase converts carbonic acid into bicarbonate, releasing a proton (H+) into solution. The H+ is then exchanged for  sodium (Na+) ions, which facilitates the production of aqueous humor . By blocking the function of carbonic anhydrase, the Na+/H+ exchange is unable to occur, which leads to a decrease in Na+ in the cell and prevents aqueous humor production .

History
This drug, developed by Merck, was the first drug in human therapy (market introduction 1995) that resulted from structure-based drug design. It was developed to circumvent the systemic side effects of acetazolamide which has to be taken orally.

References

Further reading
 
 
 
 

Wikipedia medicine articles ready to translate
Carbonic anhydrase inhibitors
Sulfones
Sulfonamides
Merck & Co. brands
Amines
Ophthalmology drugs